Jofroi of Waterford (fl. 1300) was a French translator.

Probably a native of Waterford in Ireland, Jofroi was a Dominican, apparently based in Paris, where he produced translations of Latin works into the French language. "He has no surviving connection with Ireland other than his name. It appears from an allusion in his work that he was based in Paris."

Jofroi's known translations are:

 translation of the Secretum Secretorum, one of the most widely read books in Western Europe in the Late Middle Ages. Jofroi's French was later translated into English.
 translation of a history of the Trojan War, authorship attributed to Dares Phrygius (pseudepigraphical). (Another book  widely circulated in Latin in the Late Middle Ages.)
 translation of a history of Rome by Eutropius (historian). (Once again, a popular book in Latin).
 a co-translation, with Servais Copale, of three prose poems

His original work is a catalogue of all the known wines and ales of Europe.

References

 Hiberno-Norman literature, Evelyn Mullally, in Settlement and Society in Medieval Ireland: Studies presented to F.X. Martin, Dublin, 1988.
 Un Texte œnologique de Jofroi de Waterford et Servais Copale, Albert Henry, Romania 107 (1): 1-37, 1986.

Critical Editions

 

13th-century Irish writers
People from County Waterford
13th-century Irish people
French translators
French Dominicans
Irish Dominicans
Year of birth unknown
Irish expatriates in France
Medieval European scribes
Beer writers
Wine writers
French male writers
13th-century French writers
13th-century French people
13th-century translators
13th-century Latin writers